Santiago Mina Vallespín (born 11 March 1958) is a Spanish former footballer who played mainly as a central defender.

Club career
Born in Urrea de Gaén, Province of Teruel, Aragon, Mina began his professional career with FC Barcelona Atlètic, being relegated from Segunda División at the end of the 1976–77 season. He spent the vast majority of his career in that tier, also representing Algeciras CF (on loan, as he was doing his military service in the city), CE Sabadell FC (loan), RC Celta de Vigo and Lorca Deportiva CF.

With Celta, Mina achieved promotion to La Liga in 1982 but only contributed three matches to that feat. He made his debut in the competition on 5 September 1982, starting in a 1–0 away loss against Sevilla FC as the campaign eventually ended in relegation.

Whilst at the service of Lorca, on 14 October 1984, Mina was sent off for the only time in his career, given a straight red card by referee Alfonso Álvarez in a 6–0 defeat at UD Salamanca. He retired in 1985 following his last club's relegation, aged only 27.

International career
Mina played once with the Spain U21 team: on 26 October 1977, in a fixture against Romania in Bucharest for the 1978 UEFA European Championship qualifiers, he committed a 10th-minute penalty that was missed, and later scored an own goal in an eventual 4–0 loss.

Personal life
Mina's son, also named Santiago, is also a footballer. A forward, he too represented Celta.

Honours
Celta
Segunda División: 1981–82

References

External links

1958 births
Living people
Sportspeople from the Province of Teruel
Spanish footballers
Footballers from Aragon
Association football defenders
La Liga players
Segunda División players
Segunda División B players
FC Barcelona Atlètic players
Algeciras CF footballers
CE Sabadell FC footballers
RC Celta de Vigo players
Lorca Deportiva CF footballers
Spain under-21 international footballers